Adolphus Ypey or Adolphus Ypeus or Adolf Ypey (4 June 1749, Franeker - 27 February 1822, Leiden), was a Dutch botanist and Doctor of Philosophy and Medicine who graduated at the University of Franeker and stayed on to lecture in botany. He later lectured in Medicine at the University of Leyden.

He was the son of professor Nicolaas Ypey.
His graduate dissertation was entitled Dissertatio philosophica inauguralis de igne with academic advisor Jan Hendrik van Swinden.

Ypey is best known for his richly illustrated work of 100 plates Vervolg ob de Avbeeldingen der artseny-gewassen met derzelver Nederduitsche en Latynsche beschryvingen, published in 1813 by the Amsterdam printer J. C. Sepp en zoon, and a supplementary work to that of Johannes Zorn.

Gallery

Further works
Sijstematische Handboek der Beschouwende en Werkdaadige Scheikunde, 9 vols., Amsterdam, 1804-1812

References

1749 births
1822 deaths
18th-century Dutch botanists
19th-century Dutch botanists
Frisian scientists
People from Franekeradeel
University of Franeker alumni
Academic staff of the University of Franeker
Academic staff of Leiden University